Tha Collabo is a collaborative studio album by American rapper Big Pokey and hip hop group Wreckshop Wolfpack from Houston, Texas. It was released on November 6, 2001 through Wreckshop Records, and was produced entirely by Platinum Soul Productions (Double D, Chicken Hawk & Noke D). It also features guest appearances from Big Moe, Pimp C, Z-Ro & Chris Ward among others. The album peaked at #74 on the US Billboard Top R&B/Hip-Hop Albums chart.

Track listing

Personnel
Darrell Monroe – performer
Milton Powell – performer
Ace-Dawg – performer
Derrick Haynes – performer, producer, engineering & mixing
Derrick Dixon – performer, executive producer
Dirty $ – performer
Tyson Duplechain – performer
Isis Re' – performer
Chad Lamont Butler – performer
Kenneth Doniell Moore – performer
Chris Ward – performer
Joseph Wayne McVey IV – performer
Ronnie Spencer – performer
Salih Williams – performer
Trademark – performer
André Sargent – producer
Barry Risper – producer
Skip Holman – engineering, mixing, mastering

Chart positions

References

External links

2001 albums
Big Pokey albums